Roohul Amin Khan (born 1 April 1961) has been Senior Justice of Peshawar High Court since 16 November 2020.

Career
Khan has been judge of Peshawar High Court since 20 July 2012. He became senior justice of the aforementioned court on 16 November 2020.

References

1961 births
Living people
Judges of the Peshawar High Court
Pakistani judges